This is a list of major corporations headquartered or operates in Budapest, Hungary. The table is arranged alphabetically by company, but can also be sorted by industry.

See also
 Economy of Budapest
 Economy of Hungary
 List of companies of Hungary

References

Companies

Budapest